Gedeo–Guji clashes was a territorial conflict between the Guji Zone and the Gedeo Zone, that began in 1995. The clashes led to about 800,000 mostly ethnic Gedeos fleeing their homes, a higher number and over a shorter period of time, than occurred at the height of the more publicized Rohingya crisis in Myanmar the year before. The government pressured the refugees to return to their homes even though they fear for their lives, often by denying refugees access to humanitarian aid. 

This conflict is concurrent Territorial conflict with the Oromia–Somali clashes between Oromia Region and Somali region border in the east of the Ethiopia. These ethnic conflicts involving the Guji led to Ethiopia having the largest number of people to flee their homes in the world in 2018. Some have blamed Prime Minister Abiy Ahmed for giving space to political groups formerly banned by previous Tigrayan-led governments, such as the Ginbot 7, Oromo Liberation Front, Sidama Liberation Front and ONLF.

See also
 Ethnic violence against Amaro Koore
 Ethnic violence in Konso
 Gedeo people
 Guji Oromo
 Guji Zone

References

Conflicts in 2018
2018 in Ethiopia
Ethiopian civil conflict (2018–present)
Oromo Liberation Front
Riots and civil disorder in Ethiopia
Southern Nations, Nationalities, and Peoples' Region
Violence in Ethiopia